Neryungrinsky District (Nüörüŋgürü uluuha) is an administrative and municipal district (raion, or ulus), one of the thirty-four in the Sakha Republic, Russia. It is the southernmost district of Sakha and borders Aldansky District in the north, Olyokminsky District in the west and south, Amur Oblast and a small area of Zabaykalsky Krai in the west, and Khabarovsk Krai in the east. Its administrative center is the town of Neryungri. Population (excluding the administrative center):

Geography
The landscape of the district is mostly mountainous. The Toko-Stanovik range and lake Bolshoye Toko are located in the eastern part. The main river in the district is the Aldan with its tributaries the Timpton and the Chulman. Lake Bolshoye Toko is the deepest lake in Yakutia.

Climate

History
The district was established on November 6, 1975.

Demographics
As of the 1989 Census, the ethnic composition was as follows:
Russians: 72.5%
Yakuts: 1.3%
Evenks: 0.8%
other ethnicities: 25.4%

Economy
There are deposits of gold, coal, iron ore, molybdenum, and construction materials in the district.

Administrative divisions 
The district includes seven municipal divisions, covering a total of nine inhabited locations.

Divisional source:

*Administrative centers are shown in bold

References

Notes

Sources

Districts of the Sakha Republic

sah:Нүөрүҥгүрү